Events from the year 1751 in Great Britain.

Incumbents
 Monarch – George II
 Prime Minister – Henry Pelham (Whig)
 Parliament – 10th

Events
 25 March – legally New Year's Day for the last time in England and Wales.
 31 March – Frederick, Prince of Wales dies at Leicester House, London from a lung injury and is succeeded by his son the future George III of the United Kingdom as heir apparent to the throne; three weeks later George is made Prince of Wales. George's mother, Princess Augusta of Saxe-Gotha, becomes Dowager Princess of Wales.
 April – the Gin Act requires government inspection of distilleries and restricts sale to licensed premises.
 27 May – adoption of the Gregorian calendar: royal assent is given to An Act for Regulating the Commencement of the Year; and for Correcting the Calendar now in Use (the "Calendar Act") passed by Parliament, introducing the Gregorian Calendar, correcting the eleven-day difference between Old Style and New Style dates and making 1 January legally New Year's Day from 1752 in the British Empire. It is largely promoted by George Parker, 2nd Earl of Macclesfield.
 4 June – Dr John Wall and partners establish a porcelain factory in Worcester, "The Worcester Tonquin Manufactory", the origin of Royal Worcester.
 31 August – Robert Clive takes the Indian town of Arcot from the French.
 20 October – Charles, Duke of Bolton, marries celebrated actress Lavinia Fenton, already the mother of his three children.
 3 December – Battle of Arnee: Robert Clive defeats a Franco-Indian force.

Undated
 A British settlement is founded in Georgetown in North America.
 Newcastle Infirmary founded in Newcastle upon Tyne.
 A new Lizard Lighthouse is built in Cornwall.
 William Hogarth engraves the prints Gin Lane, Beer Street and The Four Stages of Cruelty.

Publications
 15 February – Thomas Gray's anonymous Elegy Written in a Country Church-Yard.
 Henry Fielding's novel Amelia.
 Eliza Haywood's anonymous novel The History of Miss Betsy Thoughtless.
 David Hume's book An Enquiry Concerning the Principles of Morals.
 Tobias Smollett's anonymous picaresque novel The Adventures of Peregrine Pickle.

Births
 31 January – Priscilla Wakefield (née Bell), Quaker writer and philanthropist (died 1832)
 2 May – John André, soldier (died 1780)
 4 June – John Scott, 1st Earl of Eldon, Lord Chancellor (died 1838)
 11 July – Caroline Matilda of Great Britain, posthumously-born daughter of Frederick, Prince of Wales and later queen consort of Denmark (died 1775)
 30 October – Richard Brinsley Sheridan, Irish-born dramatist and politician (died 1816)
 14 November – Capel Lofft, lawyer, writer and astronomer (died 1824 in France)
 date unknown
 John Bowles, political writer and lawyer (died 1819)
 Helen Craik, Scottish novelist and poet (died 1825) (probable year)
 Thomas Sheraton, furniture designer (died 1806)

Deaths
 20 January – John Hervey, 1st Earl of Bristol, politician (born 1665)
 29 March – Thomas Coram, sea captain and philanthropist (born c.1668)
 31 March
Frederick, Prince of Wales (born 1707)
Robert Walpole, 2nd Earl of Orford (born 1701)
 9 June – John Machin, mathematician and astronomer (b. c.1686)
 22 August – Andrew Gordon, Scottish-born Benedictine monk, physicist and inventor (born 1712)
 2 October – Thomas Mathews, Welsh admiral (born 1676)
 26 October – Philip Doddridge, nonconformist religious leader (born 1702)
 12 December – Henry St John, 1st Viscount Bolingbroke, statesman and philosopher (born 1678)
 17 December – Sir William Gooch, 1st Baronet, Governor of Virginia (born 1681)
 19 December – Louise of Great Britain, English-born queen of Frederick V of Denmark (born 1724)

References

 
Years in Great Britain